" I'm Throwing Rice (At The Girl That I Love)" is a 1949 hit written by Eddy Arnold, Steve Nelson and Ed Nelson, Jr. and first performed by Eddy Arnold.  The Eddy Arnold version went to number one on the Country & Western Best Seller Lists for four weeks.

Cover versions 
Later in 1949, Red Foley recorded his own version of the song which peaked at number eleven on the Country & Western Best Sellers charts.

References

Eddy Arnold songs
1949 songs
Songs written by Eddy Arnold
Songs written by Steve Nelson (songwriter)